Qaasim Asani Malik Seawright-Middleton is an American actor and musician best known for his role in the Nickelodeon TV series The Naked Brothers Band.

Qaasim also starred in the HBO documentary movie The Music in Me, and finished eighth place in the fourteenth season of American Idol in 2015.

Early life
Qaasim Middleton was born in New York City, New York. He is the son of actor/musician Keith Middleton, who performed in the New York cast of STOMP, and actress/singer-songwriter Toni Seawright, the first African American Miss Mississippi and a 4th runner-up in Miss America. He graduated from Fiorello H. LaGuardia High School of Music & Art and Performing Arts.

Career
Middleton is the guitar player for The Naked Brothers Band. He is the newest member to the band and is the replacement for Cole Hawkins and Joshua Kaye as lead guitarist. In the show, it is revealed that he is greatly influenced by Jimi Hendrix. He was also featured in HBO's The Music in Me where he performed as a percussionist.

American Idol
While in the Top 11, after receiving the lowest number of votes for the week, Middleton was given by the judges the only elimination save of the season and finished in eighth place.

Performances and results

Discography

Digital singles

Filmography
The Naked Brothers Band (TV series) (2007–2009)
The Naked Brothers Band: Battle of the Bands (2007)
The Naked Brothers Band: Sidekicks (2008)
The Naked Brothers Band: Polar Bears (2008)
The Naked Brothers Band: Mystery Girl (2008)
The Naked Brothers Band: Operation Mojo (2008)
The Naked Brothers Band: Naked Idol (2009)
The Naked Brothers Band: The Premiere (2009)
American Idol (2015)
The Get Down (2016)

References

External links

American male child actors
American male television actors
African-American male actors
Living people
The Naked Brothers Band members
American Idol participants
People from Brooklyn
Year of birth missing (living people)
21st-century African-American male singers